Gainsborough Town Hall is a municipal building in the Market Place in Gainsborough, Lincolnshire, England. The town hall was the headquarters of Gainsborough Urban District Council and now serves as a local entertainment venue.

History

The first municipal building in the town was a medieval moot hall in the market place; it was arcaded on the ground floor so that markets could be held with an assembly room on the first floor. In the early 1890s, civic leaders decided to demolish the old structure, which had become decrepit and unsafe, and to commission a new town hall on the same site.

The new building was designed by Meeke and Bramall in the Italianate style, built in red brick with stone dressings at a cost of £3,250 and completed in 1892. The design involved a symmetrical main frontage with eight bays facing onto the Market Square; the central section of two bays featured two round headed windows on the ground floor with a single large round headed window on the first floor flanked by pilasters supporting a pediment containing a clock in the tympanum. There were doorways in the third and the sixth bays. The left and right sections, which contained round headed windows on the ground floor and sash windows on the first floor, were also flanked by pilasters supporting pediments at roof level. Internally, the left hand section contained retail units and a butter market, while the right hand section contained the council chamber.

Following significant population growth, largely associated the boiler-making and ironworks industries, the area became an urban district in 1895. The Leader of the Labour Party, George Lansbury, visited the town hall but fell and broke his thigh while attending a fete there on 9 December 1933.

On the night of 28–29 April 1942 a single Dornier 217 dropped a 500 kg general-purpose bomb on the town centre blowing out the front of the town hall. Following the damage the council established new council offices 6 Lord Street. Restoration works, which included the provision of new concrete foundations and the installation of a much less ornate façade, were completed in July 1955.

The council subsequently moved to the guildhall on Caskgate Street  which was officially opened by the chairman of the Yorkshire and Humberside economic planning council, Sir Roger Stevens, on 7 July 1966. The town hall was subsequently sold to a developer and the first floor was converted for use as an entertainment venue with seating in the main hall for up to 150 people. The neighbourhood plan published by Gainsborough Town Council in October 2019 recommended that steps be taken to "return the façade to its previous glory."

References

Government buildings completed in 1892
City and town halls in Lincolnshire
Gainsborough, Lincolnshire